Philippe de Montfort may refer to:

 Philip of Montfort, Lord of Tyre, known as Philippe I, a powerful baron in Outremer
 Philip of Montfort, Lord of Castres, known as Philippe II, eldest son of the above, a lieutenant of Charles I of Sicily